The Chinese Text Project (CTP) is a digital library project that assembles collections of early Chinese texts. The name of the project in Chinese literally means "The Chinese Philosophical Book Digitization Project", showing its focus on books related to Chinese philosophy. It aims at providing accessible and accurate versions of a wide range of texts, particularly those relating to Chinese philosophy, and the site is credited with providing one of the most comprehensive and accurate collections of classical Chinese texts on the Internet, as well as being one of the most useful textual databases for scholars of early Chinese texts.

Site contents

Texts are divided into pre-Qin and Han texts, and post-Han texts, with the former categorized by school of thought and the latter by dynasty. The ancient (pre-Qin and Han) section of the database contains over 5 million Chinese characters, the post-Han database over 20 million characters, and the publicly editable wiki section over 5 billion characters. Many texts also have English and Chinese translations, which are paired with the original text paragraph by paragraph as well as phrase by phrase for ease of comparison; this makes it possible for the system to be used as a useful scholarly research tool even by students with little or no knowledge of Chinese.

As well as providing customized search functionality suited to Chinese texts, the site also attempts to make use of the unique format of the web to offer a range of features relevant to sinologists, including an integrated dictionary, word lists, parallel passage information, scanned source texts, concordance and index data, a metadata system, Chinese commentary display, a published resources database, and a discussion forum in which threads can be linked to specific data on the site. The "Library" section of the site also includes scanned copies of over 25 million pages of early Chinese texts, linked line by line to transcriptions in the full-text database, many creating using Optical Character Recognition, and edited and maintained using an online crowd-sourcing wiki system. Textual data and metadata can also be exported using an Application Programming Interface, allowing integration with other online tools as well as use in text mining and digital humanities projects.

References

External links
 Chinese Text Project
 中國哲學書電子化計劃 
Chinese Text Project at Douban 

Discipline-oriented digital libraries
Digital humanities
Chinese classic texts
2006 establishments